James Chih-Fang Huang (born September 14, 1958) is a Taiwanese diplomat who served as the Minister of Foreign Affairs from 2006 to 2008.

Education
Huang earned a bachelor's degree in political science from National Taiwan University.

Political career
Huang began working for Chen Chien-jen in 1985, as Chen's secretary. Huang then became the English interpreter for Lien Chan and Vincent Siew. He joined the Mainland Affairs Council in 1999, and left in 2002, when he began working directly for President Chen Shui-bian. Huang began his tenure in the Presidential Office as a spokesman and was later promoted to deputy chief of staff. On 25 January 2006, Huang replaced Mark Chen as foreign minister. In June 2007, Huang submitted his resignation to President Chen following the severing of ties between Costa Rica and the Republic of China. However, Chen rejected Huang's resignation. In May 2008, days before his term was to expire with the outgoing Chen administration, Huang resigned over the loss of public money equivalent to US$30 million during a controversial failed attempt to secure diplomatic ties with Papua New Guinea. Tsai Ing-wen announced her intent to pursue a "southbound policy" during her 2016 presidential campaign. Huang became the first director of the New Southbound Policy Office after Tsai took office as president. In January 2017, Huang was appointed as the Chairman of the Taiwan External Trade Development Council.

References

Living people
1958 births
National Taiwan University alumni
Taiwanese Ministers of Foreign Affairs
Politicians of the Republic of China on Taiwan from Tainan